The Papenoo Hydroelectric Power Station is located near the commune of Papenoo on the island Tahiti in the overseas country of France, French Polynesia. It has an installed capacity of 28 MW and was constructed between 1989 and 1994. The hydroelectric power station is owned by Electricite de Tahiti SA. It is the largest hydroelectric power station in Tahiti.

It uses water provided by five reservoirs high up in the Papenoo Valley, above the commune. Each reservoir is created on the Papenoo River or a tributary by an embankment dam. It is the tallest dam in Tahiti.

Water from the reservoirs is sent to three separate power stations via  of penstock.

See also

Hitia'a Hydroelectric Power Station

References

Dams in French Polynesia
Dams completed in 1994
Hydroelectric power stations in France
Energy infrastructure completed in 1994
Power stations in French Polynesia